At the 1984 Summer Olympics in Los Angeles, eight events in fencing were contested. They were held between August 1 and 11 at the Long Beach Convention Center.

Medal summary

Men's events

Women's events

Medal table

Participating nations
A total of 262 fencers (202 men and 60 women) from 38 nations competed at the Los Angeles Games:

See also
 Fencing at the Friendship Games

References

External links
Official Olympic Report

 
1984
1984 Summer Olympics events
1984 in fencing
International fencing competitions hosted by the United States